Aksakal railway station is a railway station near Ergili, Balıkesir in Turkey.

References

External links
Station timetable
TCDD Taşımacılık

Railway stations in Balıkesir Province
Bandırma